Whaling in Argentina was a major industry in both the South Pacific and South Atlantic coasts, and around the Falkland Islands. The primary whalers were Norwegian and Scottish ships, and the primary quarry the southern right whale.

References

 
Economic history of Argentina